Hlyboka Raion is a former administrative district of Chernivtsi Oblast located in the historical regions of Bukovina and Hertsa, in western Ukraine. The administrative center was the urban-type settlement of Hlyboka. There were 37 villages in the raion. The raion was abolished on 18 July 2020 as part of the administrative reform of Ukraine, which reduced the number of raions of Chernivtsi Oblast to three. The area of Hlyboka Raion was merged into Chernivtsi Raion. The last estimate of the raion population was  

According to the Ukraine Census (2001), the 72,676 residents of the raion reported themselves as following: Ukrainians: 34,025, Romanians: 32,923, Moldovans: 4,425, Russians: 877, and other: 426.

The raion also had 34 public hospitals and clinics.

At the time of disestablishment, the raion consisted of eight hromadas:
 Chahor rural hromada with the administration in the selo of Chahor;
 Hlyboka settlement hromada with the administration in Hlyboka;
 Kamianka rural hromada with the administration in the selo of Kamianka;
 Karapchiv rural hromada with the administration in the selo of Karapchiv;
 Sucheveny rural hromada with the administration in the selo of Sucheveny;
 Tarashany rural hromada with the administration in the selo of Tarashany;
 Terebleche rural hromada with the administration in the selo of Terebleche;
 Voloka rural hromada with the administration in the selo of Voloka.

See also
 Subdivisions of Ukraine

References

External links

 bucoda.cv.ua - Official website
 Chernivtsi Oblast Nationalities
 Verkhovna Rada website - Administrative divisions of the Hlybotskyi Raion

Former raions of Chernivtsi Oblast
Romanian communities in Ukraine
1956 establishments in Ukraine
Ukrainian raions abolished during the 2020 administrative reform